The Smackover Formation is a geologic formation in Arkansas. It preserves fossils dating back to the Jurassic period.

The Smackover Formation consists of oolitic limestones and silty limestones.

Mineral resources

The Smackover Formation has been a prolific source of petroleum. The 1922 discovery of the Smackover oil field, after which the Smackover Formation is named, resulted in a sizeable oil boom in southern Arkansas.

In addition to being a petroleum reservoir, as of 2015, the brine from the Smackover Formation is the only source of commercial bromine in the United States.

A 2022 report estimated that the lithium brine in the formation has "sufficient lithium to produce enough batteries for 50 million electric vehicles."

See also

 List of fossiliferous stratigraphic units in Arkansas
 Paleontology in Arkansas
 Smackover, Arkansas
 Bromine production in the United States
 Lithium production
 Brine mining

References

Jurassic Arkansas
Oxfordian Stage